Anahata is a studio album by Louisville-based math rock band June of 44, released on June 10, 1999, by Quarterstick Records.

Critical reception
Exclaim! called the album June of 44's "most satisfying outing to date, largely because they seem to have refocused their sweat and toil on writing songs — or riffs and motifs, to be more accurate." Portland Mercury wrote that the band perfected "their squirrelly amalgam of post-rock and post-hardcore." The Dallas Observer wrote that "the playing is uniformly excellent ([Doug] Scharin is one of rock's most underrated drummers) but not in the service of any particularly dynamic ideas." CMJ New Music Monthly wrote that the band's "tactic of flatly shouting its lyrics, often in unison, detracts from the musical backdrop."

Track listing

Personnel
Adapted from the Anahata liner notes.

June of 44
 Fred Erskine – bass guitar, trumpet, keyboards, vocals
 Sean Meadows – electric guitar, bass guitar, vocals
 Jeff Mueller – electric guitar, vocals
 Doug Scharin – drums, percussion, vibraphone, keyboards, sampler

Additional musicians
 Julie Liu – viola (3)
 Chiyoko Yoshida – vocals (6)
Production and additional personnel
 Christina Files – recording (5, 6)
 John Golden – mastering
 Bob Weston – production, recording, mixing

Release history

References

External links 
 

1999 albums
June of 44 albums
Quarterstick Records albums
Albums produced by Bob Weston